Calcutta International School (or CIS) is an international school, established in the late 1953s, in Kolkata, India. It is located in 724 Anandapur, West Bengal.

References

External links
  

Cambridge schools in India
Primary schools in West Bengal
High schools and secondary schools in Kolkata
International schools in Kolkata
Educational institutions established in 1953
1953 establishments in West Bengal
Boarding schools in West Bengal